Ilanga platypeza is a species of sea snail, a marine gastropod mollusk in the family Solariellidae.

Description
The size of the shell varies between 4.4 mm and 6.3 mm.

Distribution
This marine species occurs off Southwest Transkei to the Eastern Cape Province, South Africa

References

External links
 To World Register of Marine Species

platypeza
Gastropods described in 1987